Kumamoto dialect is a dialect of the Japanese language spoken in Kumamoto Prefecture. It belongs to the Hichiku group, and shares similarities with other nearby dialects in Kyushu.

Features

Adjectives 
The I adjective in Standard Japanese becomes "か" (ka) in Kumamoto dialect:

うまい (umai, "tasty") > うまか (umaka)

よい (yoi, "good") > よか (yoka)

This feature is found in other Kyushu dialects. The negative conjugation "ない" (nai) also becomes "なか" (naka).

Accent 
Unlike Standard Japanese, Kumamoto dialect is described as "accentless", meaning it has no fixed tonal pattern.

Words 
Kumamoto dialect has a different set of Ko-so-a-do words:

これ (kore, "this") > こっ (ko')

それ (sore, "that") > そっ (so')

あれ (are, "that over there") > あっ (a')

どれ (dore, "which") > どっ (do')

References 

Japanese dialects
Kumamoto